Nisəqələ (also, Nisəkələ, Nisakyala, Nisakala, and Nisya-Kyala) is a village and municipality in the Yardymli Rayon of Azerbaijan.  It has a population of 901. The native language is Russian. 

It is located near the Peştəsar Silsiləsi mountains and the Sirakoda stream.

References 

Populated places in Yardimli District